MNC may refer to:

Places 
 Monaco, UNDP country code
 , a museum in Mexico City, Mexico

Language 
 Manchu language

Business 
Multinational corporation
 MNC Corporation, an Indonesian conglomerate
 Media Nusantara Citra, the corporation media subsidiary
 MNC Channels, network of pay television channels
 MNC Channel, former channel
 MNC News
 MNC Sports
 MNC World News, former channel
 MNC Trijaya FM, radio network
 MNC Vision, pay television provider
 MNCTV, terrestrial television network
Merle Norman Cosmetics, American cosmetic company
 Monde Nissin Corporation, Philippine food and beverage company
 Mongolian News Channel, Mongolian TV broadcaster

Technology 

 Mobile network code

Other uses 
 Mouvement National Congolais
 Mythical national championship